The 2018–19 Vinoo Mankad Trophy is the current season of the Vinoo Mankad Trophy, an Under-19s Limited overs cricket tournament in India.

It is being contested by 35 domestic cricket teams of India, starting on 5 October 2018, ahead of the 2018–19 Ranji Trophy.
The tournament has four groups, with nine teams in Elite Groups A and B, and eight teams in Elite Group C. All the new teams were placed in the Plate Group.
All the Elite Group A matches is being hosted in Surat by Surat District Cricket Association, affiliated to Gujarat Cricket Association from 5–24 October 2018.

Teams
The teams were drawn in the following groups:

EliteGroup A
 Assam
 Bengal
 Gujarat
 Jharkhand
 Karnataka
 Madhya Pradesh
 Maharashtra
 Mumbai
 Uttar Pradesh

Elite Group B
 Andhra
 Baroda
 Chhattisgarh
 Delhi
 Haryana
 Hyderabad
 Punjab
 Tripura
 Vidarbha

Elite Group C
 Goa
 Himachal Pradesh
 Jammu and Kashmir
 Kerala
 Odisha
 Rajasthan
 Saurashtra
 Tamil Nadu

Plate Group
 Arunachal Pradesh
 Bihar
 Manipur
 Meghalaya
 Mizoram
 Nagaland
 Puducherry
 Sikkim
 Uttarakhand

Statistics

Most runs

Most wickets

References

2018 in Indian cricket
2019 in Indian cricket
Indian domestic cricket competitions